The Russian Armed Forces have launched several rocket attacks on Vinnytsia, Ukraine, during the 2022 Russian invasion of Ukraine. A Russian attack in July 2022 which killed 28 people including 3 children, received widespread condemnation and has been labeled as a war crime by EU officials.

March infrastructure attacks 
On 6 March 2022, Russian forces launched rocket strikes against the Havryshivka Vinnytsia International Airport. According to President Volodymyr Zelenskyy, eight rockets launched by Russia destroyed the infrastructure of Vinnytsia airport located in central Ukraine. Satellite imagery showed two buildings ruined, as well as one aircraft destroyed. Ten people were killed in the strike and six injured. There were claims that the missiles were fired from Transnistria, a Russian-backed breakaway state internationally recognized as part of Moldova geographically close to the city. However, Moldovan officials denied this and declared that they had been launched from Russian ships in the Black Sea.

The Vinnytsia TV Mast was hit by Russian rocket fire on 16 March 2022, knocking out the city's broadcasting abilities.

On 25 March 2022, Russian forces launched an airstrike against a Ukrainian Air Force National Military Command Centre located in Vinnytsia, Ukraine. The airstrike consisted of six cruise missiles, that caused significant destruction to the infrastructure.

July rocket attack on the city centre 
At about 10:10 AM on 14 July 2022, an air raid alarm sounded in the city. At approximately 10:42 local residents reported three explosions in the city. Before that, local residents noticed a missile flying over Bershad city and Vinnytsia. According to Ukrainian authorities, the Russian Naval Forces fired five Kalibr cruise missiles from a submarine in the Black Sea. Ukraine claims that two of the missiles were shot down. According to Ukrainian officials, the missiles also struck civilian buildings, including a medical center, offices, stores and residential buildings. The attacks killed at least 28 people (including three children), and injured at least 202 others. The Ministry of Defense of Russia said that they hit the military officers' club, where allegedly "...a meeting of the command of the Ukrainian Air Force with representatives of foreign arms suppliers was taking place..." According to them, most participants of the meeting were killed. Among the dead were three officers of the Air Force of Ukraine, including Colonels Dmytro Burdiko and Oleg Makarchuk. The missile strike occurred during a conference in The Hague on holding Russia accountable for war crimes.

Reactions 
Local officials pointed out that Kalibr missiles are high-precision, which indicates that the Russians purposefully targeted civilians. The strike has been labeled as a war crime by officials from multiple countries.

Ukrainian president Volodymyr Zelenskyy wrote on his Telegram channel: "Vinnytsia. Missile strikes in the city centre. There are wounded and killed, among them a little child. Every day, Russia destroys the civilian population, kills Ukrainian children, directs rockets at civilian objects. Where there is nothing military. What is this if not an open terrorist attack? Inhuman. Country of killers. A country of terrorists". The strike has been labeled as a war crime by Ukrainian Interior Minister Denys Monastyrsky.

The ambassador of Moldova to Ukraine, Valeriu Chiveri, condemned the attack on Vinnytsia, referring to attacks on civilian targets in Ukrainian cities away from the frontlines as crimes against humanity. He also mentioned the European Union's decision to grant candidate status to both Moldova and Ukraine and talked about the need for both countries to work together.

Days after the 14 July bombing, at the site of four-year-old Liza Dmitrieva's death, an impromptu memorial for her was created to which flowers and children's toys were laid. The video with Liza was shown on 20 July, in the US Congress.

Gallery

References

External links

March 2022 events in Ukraine
July 2022 events in Ukraine
Airstrikes during the 2022 Russian invasion of Ukraine
Attacks on buildings and structures in Ukraine
History of Vinnytsia
War crimes during the 2022 Russian invasion of Ukraine
Airstrikes conducted by Russia